Anna Thamma (Kannada: ಅಣ್ಣ ತಮ್ಮ) is a 1968 Indian Kannada film, directed by K. S. L. Swamy (Ravi) and produced by N. Bhakta Vatsalan. The film stars Kalyan Kumar, Kalpana, Leelavathi and Udaykumar in the lead roles. The film has musical score by Vijaya Bhaskar.

Cast
Kalyan Kumar
Kalpana
Leelavathi
Udaykumar

References

External links
 

1968 films
1960s Kannada-language films
Films directed by K. S. L. Swamy